Tiefa is a town in Diaobingshan, in the north of Liaoning Province in Northeast China. Diaobingshan was known as Tiefa until 2002.

References

Towns in Liaoning